OBJ is a programming language family introduced by Joseph Goguen in 1976, and further worked on by Jose Meseguer.

Overview
It is a family of declarative "ultra high-level" languages. It features abstract types, generic modules, subsorts (subtypes with multiple inheritance), pattern-matching modulo equations, E-strategies (user control over laziness), module expressions (for combining modules), theories and views (for describing module interfaces) for the massively parallel RRM (rewrite rule machine).
 
Members of the OBJ family of languages include CafeOBJ, Eqlog, FOOPS, Kumo, Maude, OBJ2, and OBJ3.

OBJ2

OBJ2 is a programming language with Clear-like parametrised modules and a functional system based on equations.

OBJ3
OBJ3 is a version of OBJ based on order-sorted rewriting. OBJ3 is agent-oriented and runs on Kyoto Common Lisp AKCL.

See also
 Automated theorem proving
 Formal methods

References

 J. A. Goguen, Higher-Order Functions Considered Unnecessary for Higher-Order Programming. In Research Topics in Functional Programming (June 1990). pp. 309–351.
"Principles of OBJ2", K. Futatsugi et al., 12th POPL, ACM 1985, pp. 52–66.

External links
The OBJ archive
The OBJ family
Information and OBJ3 manual, PostScript format

Academic programming languages
Functional languages
Logic in computer science
Formal specification languages
Theorem proving software systems
Term-rewriting programming languages